Edwards Manufacturing Company is a business in Albert Lea, Minnesota that manufactures Hydraulic Ironworkers.

History 

Manufacturing since 1875 Edwards began with road graders, and other manufacturing equipment such as the stump puller, Manual Shears, and Intake Grates.

Ironworkers 

Edwards Manufacturing Company manufactures Ironworkers and hydraulic equipment. Ironworkers are machines that speed up fabrication by punching and shearing opposed to drilling or using a saw. Edwards Ironworkers can have a Hydraulic Accessory Pack that allows separate machinery to plug into the Ironworker and use the Ironworker's hydraulic power. Edwards Manufacturing Company has a line of 12 ironworkers and 5 Hydraulic Accessories as of 2015.

References

Manufacturing companies based in Minnesota
Machine tool builders